A Master in Biochemistry (MBiochem or MBioch) degree is a specific master's degree for courses in the field of Biochemistry.

United Kingdom
In the UK, the MBiochem degree is an undergraduate award, available after pursuing a four-year course of study at a university. It is classed as a level 7 qualification in the National Qualifications Framework.

Germany
In Germany, the Master of Biochemistry is usually a graduate degree following a bachelor. It is offered by a few universities who have reorganized their teaching to be completely in English to better prepare for a scientific career that operates with English as its lingua franca. Examples are the Master of Biochemistry (M.Sc.) in Bochum and Tübingen.

Structure
In terms of course structure, MBiochem degrees have the same content that is usually seen in other degree programmes, i.e. lectures, laboratory work, coursework and exams each year. A substantial project is often undertaken in the fourth-year, which typically involves independent research. At the end of the second or third years, there is usually a threshold of academic performance in examinations to be reached to allow progression into the final year. Final results are awarded on the standard British undergraduate degree classification scale.

Master's degrees